Algeria have appeared in the finals of the Summer Olympics Football Tournament on two occasions in 1980 with the Algeria first team and in 2016 with Algeria U23 after opening olympic football tournament to U23 national teams since 1992.
They have once qualified for the knockout rounds, reaching the quarter-finals in 1980 before losing to Yugoslavia.

Records

By match

Record by opponent

* Games of East Germany are counted towards Germany.

Participations

Algeria at Moscow 1980 
Group C

Quarter-finals

Algeria at Rio de Janeiro 2016 
Group D

Goalscorers

References

External links
Games of the XXII. Olympiad Football Tournament (Moscow 1980) - Rec.Sport.Soccer Statistics Foundation
Games of the XXXI. Olympiad Football Tournament (Rio de Janeiro 2016) - Rec.Sport.Soccer Statistics Foundation

Football
Olympic Games
Olympic Games